Manaf Abd al-Rahim al-Rawi (Arabic: مناف عبد الرحيم الراوي) (died April 1, 2013) was a senior Iraqi leader of Al Qaeda in Iraq (AQI), acting as its "governor" for Baghdad province.

Al-Rawi was arrested on March 11, 2010 by Iraqi security forces. Iraqi government sources claimed al-Rawi was responsible for planning multiple-vehicle bombings in Baghdad. Under interrogation, he reportedly gave authorities information which led to the killing of the group's top two leaders, Abu Ayyub al-Masri and Abu Omar al-Baghdadi, in April 2010. He was later convicted of terrorism and was executed on April 1, 2013.

References

2013 deaths
Iraqi al-Qaeda members
Year of birth missing
Members of al-Qaeda in Iraq
21st-century executions by Iraq